The Melbourne Art Trams is a major public art project in Melbourne, Australia. It is a revival and re-imagining of the Transporting Art project which ran from 1978 to 1993 and saw 36 painted W-class trams rolled out across the Melbourne network.

Melbourne Festival reinvigorated the project in 2013 with an annual expression of interest process from Victorian-based artists. Seven professional and one emerging artist are commissioned each year, with their artwork digitally printed on vinyl and applied to modern trams. The eight designs are released onto the network each October as part of Melbourne Festival's visual art program.

In 2017, one design celebrated the 20 year anniversary of the shared history of tram workers and decorated trams in Melbourne and Kolkata, India. In 2018, the project was renewed for three years.

The project is funded by Melbourne Festival, Creative Victoria, Public Transport Victoria and Yarra Trams.

Artists

Gallery

References

Public art in Melbourne
Trams in Melbourne
Art vehicles